Joshua Wong (born 1996) is a Hong Kong student activist.

Joshua Wong may also refer to:
Joshua Wong (1906–1981), East Indies film director and one of the Wong brothers
Joshua Wong (21st century), Hong Kong musician with Noughts and Exes